The Former Qin, also called Fu Qin (苻秦), (351–394) was a dynastic state of the Sixteen Kingdoms in Chinese history ruled by the Di ethnicity. Founded by Fu Jian (posthumously Emperor Jingming) who originally served under the Later Zhao dynasty, it completed the unification of northern China in 376. Its capital was Xi'an up to the death of the Emperor Xuanzhao in 385.  Despite its name, the Former Qin was much later and less powerful than the Qin dynasty which had ruled all of China proper during the 3rd century BC. The adjectival prefix "former" is used to distinguish it from the "Later Qin dynasty" (384-417).

In 383, the severe defeat of the Former Qin by the Jin dynasty at the Battle of Fei River encouraged uprisings, splitting Former Qin territory into two noncontiguous pieces after the death of Fu Jian. One fragment, at present-day Taiyuan, Shanxi was soon overwhelmed in 386 by the Xianbei under the Later Yan and the Dingling. The other struggled in greatly reduced territories around the border of present-day Shaanxi and Gansu until disintegration in 394 following years of invasions by Western Qin and Later Qin.

In 327, the Gaochang commandery was created by the Former Liang dynasty under Zhang Gui. After this, significant ethnic Han settlement occurred, meaning that a major part of the population became Han. In 383, the General Lu Guang of Former Qin seized control of the region.

All rulers of Former Qin proclaimed themselves "Emperor", except for Fu Jian (苻堅) (357–385) who instead claimed the title "Heavenly King" (Tian Wang). He was nonetheless posthumously considered an emperor by the Former Qin imperial court.

Rulers of the Former Qin

¹ Fu Sheng was posthumously given the title "wang" even though he had reigned as emperor.

Rulers family tree

See also
Chinese history
Chinese sovereign
Di (Wu Hu)
Fu Jian (337–385)
Wang Meng
Battle of Fei River

Notes and references 

 
Dynasties in Chinese history
Former countries in Chinese history
351 establishments
394 disestablishments